ALLDATA LLC is an online source for automotive original equipment manufacturer (OEM) information. ALLDATA provides vehicle manufacturers' diagnostic and repair information.

ALLDATA was founded in 1986 to meet market demand for OE repair information. As computer technology took hold, ALLDATA began compiling the largest single source of OEM information available and converted it into a digital format. ALLDATA is known for online OEM information, used by over 300,000 professional technicians worldwide. The company expanded its product line to include collision information, business tools and support services for the global automotive industry.

In 1996, ALLDATA was purchased by AutoZone.

References
 "ALLDATA company profile". D&B Hoover's. Retrieved on July 16, 2008.
 It is recognized as a valuable resource for both independent repair shops management software

External links
 ALLDATA

Companies established in 1986
Companies based in Sacramento County, California
Elk Grove, California
1986 establishments in California